Eduardo Rocha (born 30 September 1966) is a Brazilian politician who serves as Secretary of the Civil House of Mato Grosso do Sul, in the government of Eduardo Riedel, as well as a state deputy for Mato Grosso do Sul since 2011, he is married to Simone Tebet, a minister in the Government Lula da Silva.

Eduardo also served as Secretary of State for Government and Strategic Management from December 3, 2021 to January 1, 2023, during the government of Reinaldo Azambuja.

Biography 
Born in the city of Birigui, in São Paulo, Eduardo moved with his family – father, mother and two sisters – to Três Lagoas, in Mato Grosso do Sul, at the age of two.

Formation 
In 1996, he graduated from the Faculty of Economics in Andradina and married Simone Tebet, now Minister of Planning, Development and Management, with whom he had two daughters.

Career 
He acted as a parliamentary advisor to his father-in-law, senator Ramez Tebet and took care of his office in the capital Campo Grande. When his wife was elected mayor of Três Lagoas, he returned to the city.

In 2010, he was elected state deputy with 25,428 votes, being re-elected in 2014 with 30,873 votes and, in 2018, with 22,347 votes. He was leader of the Brazilian Democratic Movement bench in the Assembly from 2011 to 2019, leaving office when he was elected vice president of Legislative Assembly of Mato Grosso do Sul.

On December 3, 2021, he was appointed Secretary of State for Government and Strategic Management by Governor Reinaldo Azambuja, a position he held until January 1, 2023.

On January 1, 2023, he was appointed Secretary of the Civil House of Mato Grosso do Sul, by governor Eduardo Riedel.

References 

Brazilian politicians
Living people
1966 births
People from Birigui